The 2006 V8 Supercar season was the 47th year of touring car racing in Australia since the first runnings of the Australian Touring Car Championship and the fore-runner of the present day Bathurst 1000, the Armstrong 500.

There were 21 V8 Supercar meetings held during 2006; a thirteen-round series for V8 Supercars, the 2006 V8 Supercar Championship Series (VCS), two of them endurance races; a seven-round second tier V8 Supercar series 2006 Fujitsu V8 Supercar Series (FVS) and a V8 Supercar support programme event at the 2006 Australian Grand Prix.

This was the last season of V8 Supercars broadcast by Network Ten and Fox Sports; at the conclusion of 2006 the broadcasting rights were handed over to the Seven Network from 2007 to 2014. However, since 2015 Network Ten and Fox Sports are still permitted to revive their V8 Supercars rights with Ten shows seven events live plus highlights and Fox Sports shows every practice, qualifying and race live.

Season review
Rick Kelly won the championship. It came down to the last race, where Rick Kelly narrowly beat Craig Lowndes for the championship.

Results and standings

Race calendar
The 2006 V8 Supercar season consisted of 21 events.

Panasonic V8 Supercars GP 100 
This meeting was a support event of the 2006 Australian Grand Prix.

Fujitsu V8 Supercar Series

V8 Supercar Championship Series

References

Additional references can be found in linked event/series reports.

External links
 Official V8 Supercar site
 2006 Racing Results Archive 

 
Supercar seasons